Spinus may refer to:
 Spinus (bird), a genus of birds in the finch family (Fringillidae)
 Spinuș, a commune in Bihor County, Romania